Morelos is a state of Mexico.

Morelos may also refer to:
Morelos (satellite)
Morelos, State of Mexico, a municipality
Morelos Dam, a dam near Los Algodones, Baja California
Estadio Morelos, a sports stadium in Morelia, Michoacán
Morelos metro station, a station on the Mexico City Metro
Morelos (Mexico City Metrobús), a BRT station in Mexico City
Puerto Morelos, Quintana Roo

People with the name
Alfredo Morelos (born 1996), Colombian footballer
José María Morelos (1765–1815), leader of the Mexican War of Independence
Lisette Morelos (born 1978), Mexican actress

See also
Morelos Municipality (disambiguation)